William Duborgh Jensen (10 May 1935 – 24 May 2017) was a Norwegian fashion and costume designer.

William was first known as a fashion designer; he was Norway's first "haute couturier" with his own collection in 1958. He later worked in television and film as a costume designer.

He was appointed as a Knight, First Class of the Order of St. Olav in 2006 for his efforts in fashion design.

William died at the age of 82.

References

1935 births
2017 deaths
Businesspeople from Oslo
Norwegian fashion designers